Zhu Qiuying (born October 3, 1994) is a Chinese former competitive figure skater. She qualified to the free skate at two Four Continents Championships and one World Junior Championship.

Programs

Competitive highlights
GP: Grand Prix; JGP: Junior Grand Prix

References

External links 

 
 
 
 

1994 births
Living people
Chinese female single skaters
Figure skaters from Harbin